The 1886 United States House of Representatives elections in Florida were held November 2, 1886 for the 50th Congress.

Background
The previous elections had solidified Democratic domination of Florida's congressional delegation.  Florida would be represented entirely by Democrats in both houses of Congress until 1954

Election results
Both incumbents ran successfully for re-election.  This election marked the first appearance of the Prohibition Party in Florida's congressional elections.

See also
United States House of Representatives elections, 1886

References

1886
Florida
United States House of Representatives